Zhou Hong (born 10 March 1966) is a Chinese former volleyball player who competed in the 1992 Summer Olympics.

References

1966 births
Living people
Chinese women's volleyball players
Olympic volleyball players of China
Volleyball players at the 1992 Summer Olympics
Asian Games medalists in volleyball
Volleyball players at the 1990 Asian Games
Medalists at the 1990 Asian Games
Asian Games gold medalists for China
20th-century Chinese women